Sensor journalism refers to the use of sensors to generate or collect data, then analyzing, visualizing, or using the data to support journalistic inquiry. This is related to but distinct from data journalism. Whereas data journalism relies on using historical or existing data, sensor journalism involves the creation of data with sensor tools. This also includes drone journalism.

Background

Examples of sensor-based journalism (below) date back to the early 2000s and usually involve the use of sensor tools to generate or collect data to be reported on. The way in which the sensors are deployed varies. In some cases, a journalist will learn how to operate and deploy a sensor (see Houston Chronicle) while in others (see WNYC Cicada Tracker), the sensors are built and deployed by the general public. Journalists can also request data from existing sensor networks (see Sun Sentinel example) and remote sensors (see ProPublica example).

Sensors used for reporting can be closed source with expressly stated terms of use or open source, which allows for modification of the sensor downstream of development.

Sensor journalism modules have been taught at Emerson College (around water quality/contamination) and Florida International University (around sea-level rise). San Diego State University planned an air-quality sensor-journalism module for spring 2015.

Examples

 Houston Chronicle, In Harm’s Way

A study about toxic chemicals in the air in public parks.

 USA Today, Ghost Factories

A series that looked at lead-contaminated soil in neighborhoods around previous U.S. lead factories.

 Sun Sentinel, Above the Law

A series about the tendencies of cops to speed.

 WNYC Cicada Tracker

A project that revolved around the emergence of Magicicada.

 Washington Post, ShotSpotter

A project with 300 acoustic sensors across 20 square miles in D.C.

 Planet Money, Planet Money Makes a T-shirt

A project that followed the production of a shirt from beginning to end.

 ProPublica, Losing Ground

A study of sea-level rise in Louisiana.

Related

 Citizen science
 Remote sensing
 Crowdsensing
 Crowdsourcing
 Crowdmapping
 Data journalism
 Data visualization
 Citizen journalism
 Environmental monitoring
 Open software/hardware
 Open source
 Open science

Tools and platforms
 OpenStreetMap
 CartoDB
 Xively
 OpenSensors.com
 Public Laboratory for Open Technology and Science
 Manylabs

References

External links 
 Pitt, Fergus (editor). Tow Center report, Sensors & Journalism, 2014.
 Fahn, James. "The Promise and Perils of Sensor-Based Journalism," Earth Journalism Network, 2013.
 Moradi, Javaun. "What Do Open Sensor Networks Mean for Journalism?," 2011.
 Bui, Lilian. "A (Working) Typology of Sensor Journalism Projects," MIT Comparative Media Studies blog, 2014
 "Sensor journalism student reflections from Emerson College"
 Kishor, Puneet. "A Taxonomy of Sensors," 2014.
 "What's In the Air?" project from San Diego State University
 King Tide Day project from Florida International University
 O'Donovan, Caroline. "The cicadas are coming: WNYC’s tracker is the latest sign of the rise of sensor news networks," Nieman Lab, 2013.
 Waite, Matt. "How sensor journalism can help us create data, improve our storytelling," Poynter, 2013.
 Nelson, Jennifer. "Sensor journalism: Finding meaning within the data," Reynolds Journalism Institute (2014).

21st-century introductions
Types of journalism
Sensors